Gender and Education is a peer-reviewed journal, published eight times a year by Taylor and Francis with a focus on global perspectives on education, gender and culture.

The journal is aligned with the Gender and Education Association (GEA), and is co-edited by Carol Taylor (University of Cambridge), Susanne Gannon (Western Sydney University), Jayne Osgood (Middlesex University) and Kathryn Scantlebury (University of Delaware).

Abstracting and indexing 

According to the Journal Citation Reports, the journal has a 2020 impact factor of 2.081, ranking it 152nd out of 254 journals in the category "Education & Educational Research".

References

External links 
 

Education journals
English-language journals
Gender studies journals
Publications established in 1989
Taylor & Francis academic journals
7 times per year journals